The 2021 Astana Open was a tennis tournament organized for professional tennis players, held in Astana, Kazakhstan, in 2021 on indoor hard courts. It was primarily organized due to the cancellation of many tournaments during the 2021 ATP Tour and 2021 WTA Tour, because of the ongoing COVID-19 pandemic. It is the second edition of the tournament for the men and the first for the women. The tournament took place in Nur-Sultan, Kazakhstan, from 20–26 September for the men, and from 27 September to 2 October for the women.

Champions

Men's singles

  Kwon Soon-woo def.  James Duckworth, 7–6(8–6), 6–3

This was Kwon's first ever career ATP title.

Women's singles

  Alison Van Uytvanck def.  Yulia Putintseva, 1–6, 6–4, 6–3.

This was Van Uytvanck's fifth singles title, and first of the year.

Men's doubles

  Santiago González /  Andrés Molteni def.  Jonathan Erlich /  Andrei Vasilevski, 6–1, 6–2

Women's doubles

  Anna-Lena Friedsam /  Monica Niculescu def.  Angelina Gabueva /  Anastasia Zakharova 6–2, 4–6, [10–5]

ATP singles main draw entrants

Seeds

 Rankings are as of September 13, 2021.

Other entrants
The following players received wildcards into the singles main draw:
  Mikhail Kukushkin
  Timofey Skatov
  Fernando Verdasco

The following players received entry from the qualifying draw:
  Evgeny Donskoy
  Marc Polmans
  Dmitry Popko
  Elias Ymer

Withdrawals
Before the tournament
  Cristian Garín → replaced by  Ričardas Berankis
  Adrian Mannarino → replaced by  Daniel Elahi Galán
  Mackenzie McDonald → replaced by  Carlos Taberner

ATP doubles main draw entrants

Seeds

 Rankings are as of September 13, 2021

Other entrants
The following pairs received wildcards into the doubles main draw: 
  Alexander Bublik /  Daniil Golubev 
  Dmitry Popko /  Timofey Skatov

Withdrawals
Before the tournament
  Nathaniel Lammons /  Mackenzie McDonald → replaced by  Andre Begemann /  Nathaniel Lammons

WTA singles main draw entrants

Seeds

 Rankings are as of September 20, 2021.

Other entrants
The following players received wildcards into the singles main draw:
  Anna Danilina
  Zhibek Kulambayeva
  Anastasia Potapova

The following players received entry using protected rankings:
  Vitalia Diatchenko
  Vera Lapko
  Mandy Minella

The following players received entry from the qualifying draw:
  Katie Boulter
  Yuliya Hatouka
  Aleksandra Krunić
  Lesia Tsurenko
  Natalia Vikhlyantseva
  Anastasia Zakharova

Withdrawals
Before the tournament
  Irina-Camelia Begu → replaced by  Ekaterine Gorgodze
  Polona Hercog → replaced by  Jaqueline Cristian
  Nao Hibino → replaced by  Vitalia Diatchenko
  Anhelina Kalinina → replaced by  Stefanie Vögele
  Nuria Párrizas Díaz → replaced by  Mandy Minella
  Liudmila Samsonova → replaced by  Jule Niemeier
  Anna Karolína Schmiedlová → replaced by  Kristýna Plíšková
  Nina Stojanović → replaced by  Anna-Lena Friedsam
  Clara Tauson → replaced by  Lesley Pattinama Kerkhove
  Vera Zvonareva → replaced by  Vera Lapko

WTA doubles main draw entrants

Seeds

 Rankings are as of September 20, 2021

Other entrants
The following pairs received wildcards into the doubles main draw: 
  Gozal Ainitdinova /  Zhibek Kulambayeva 
  Sofiya Chursina /  Yekaterina Dmitrichenko

Withdrawals
Before the tournament
  Natela Dzalamidze /  Kamilla Rakhimova → replaced by  Natela Dzalamidze /  Kaja Juvan
  Vivian Heisen /  Kimberley Zimmermann → replaced by  Vitalia Diatchenko /  Yana Sizikova
  Oksana Kalashnikova /  Miyu Kato → replaced by  Varvara Gracheva /  Oksana Kalashnikova
  Aleksandra Krunić /  Nina Stojanović → replaced by  Rutuja Bhosale /  Emily Webley-Smith

References

External links
Official website

Astana Open
Astana Open
Astana Open
Astana Open